Jean-Paul Vesco, OP (born 10 March 1962) is a French prelate of the Catholic Church who serves as the Archbishop of Algiers. He has spent most of his clerical career in Algeria and was Bishop of Oran from 2012 to 2021. He is a member of the Dominicans and headed the French Dominicans from 2010 to 2012.

Biography
Jean-Paul Vesco was born on 10 March 1962 in Lyon. After earning a degree in jurisprudence, he practiced law in Lyon for seven years before joining the Dominicans in 1995, taking his vows on 14 September 1996. Vesco was ordained a priest of the Dominican order on 24 June 2001. His uncle, Jean-Luc Vesco (1934–2018), also a Dominican, was a biblical scholar who headed the École Biblique from 1984 to 1991 and led the Dominican province of Toulouse from 1976 to 1984. After studies at the École Biblique in Jerusalem, he moved to Tlemcen, Algeria, in the Diocese of Oran on 6 October 2002. This assignment reestablished the Dominican presence in that diocese six years after the assassination of its bishop, Pierre Claverie. From 2005 to 2010 he was vicar general of the diocese and from 2007 to 2010 he was also diocesan treasurer. On 16 October 2007 he was elected head of the Dominicans in Tlemcen.

In December 2010, Vasco was elected Prior Provincial of the Dominicans in France and took up his duties in Paris on 11 January 2011.

On 1 December 2012, Pope Benedict XVI appointed him bishop of Oran. He received his episcopal consecration on 25 January 2013 in the Cathedral of Oran from Cardinal Philippe Barbarin, Archbishop of Lyon, assisted by Ghaleb Moussa Abdalla Bader, archbishop of Algiers and Alphonse Georger, bishop Emeritus of Oran.

On 27 December 2021, Pope Francis appointed Vesco archbishop of Algiers.

On 27 February 2023, President Abdelmadjid Tebboune granted the Algerian nationality to Vesco, by virtue of presidential decree.

References

External links

1962 births
Living people
Clergy from Lyon
French Dominicans
French expatriate bishops
French Roman Catholic archbishops
Roman Catholic bishops of Oran
Roman Catholic archbishops of Algiers
21st-century Roman Catholic bishops in Algeria